DXWB (92.9 FM), broadcasting as 92.9 Wild FM, is a radio station owned and operated by UM Broadcasting Network. Its studios and transmitter are located in Brgy. Poblacion, Valencia, Bukidnon.

References

Radio stations in Bukidnon
Radio stations established in 1988